One Way Out is a 1955 British crime drama film directed by Francis Searle and starring Jill Adams, Eddie Byrne, Lyndon Brook, John Chandos and Arthur Lowe. The art direction was by William Kellner. This second feature was released in the UK as the supporting film to the Norman Wisdom comedy Man of the Moment.

Plot
Superintendent Harcourt is on the verge of retiring from the police force and in his final case, seeks to put away Danvers, a ruthless fence. Danvers however, tries to buy off Harcourt, and when this fails, attempts to implicate the Superintendent's daughter Shirley in a store robbery. Danvers uses another crook, Leslie Parrish, to blackmail Harcourt to drop the case against him. When the Superintendent retires, he decides to pursue Danvers as a civilian.

Cast
 Jill Adams as Shirley Harcourt
 Eddie Byrne as Superintendent Harcourt
 Lyndon Brook as Leslie Parrish
 John Chandos as Danvers
 John Bushelle as Assistant Commissioner
 Olive Milbourn as Mrs. Harcourt
 Arthur Howard as Marriott
 Arthur Lowe as Sam
 Ryck Rydon as Harry
 Anne Valery as Carol Martin
 Doris Gilmore as Mrs. Danvers
 Nicholas Tanner as Garage Attendant
 Nicholas Temple-Smith as the Baby
 Sam Kydd as Gang Member
 Victor Platt as Snack Bar Assistant (Uuncredited)

Critical reception
Britmovie called it an "unassuming British B-thriller directed by Francis Searle and starring Irish actor Eddie Byrne...and like many similar b-movies of the time is marred by weak writing and a plot that is never credible for a moment. The cast put all the effort they can in attempting to make this nonsense communicable to an audience."

References

External links

1955 films
1955 crime drama films
British crime drama films
Films set in London
Films directed by Francis Searle
1950s English-language films
1950s British films
British black-and-white films